Abaspura is a village in the Malerkotla district of Punjab, India. Formerly a part of the Sangrur district, it is located in the Malerkotla tehsil.

Geography 
Abaspura is located at eastern boundary of Malerkotla city. Nearby villages are Hathoa, Haider Nagar, Binjoki Khurd and Binjoki Kalan.

Transportation 
The nearest railway station to Abaspura is Malerkotla Railway station at a distance of 3.5 km.

References 

Villages in Malerkotla district